Camisano is a comune (municipality) in the Province of Cremona in the Italian region Lombardy, located about  east of Milan and about  northwest of Cremona.

Camisano borders the following municipalities: Barbata, Casale Cremasco-Vidolasco, Casaletto di Sopra, Castel Gabbiano, Isso, Ricengo.

References

Cities and towns in Lombardy